The 2007–08 FIS Ski Jumping World Cup was the 29th World Cup season in history. The season began on 1 December 2007 in Kuusamo, and finished on 16 March 2008 in Planica. The season was dominated by Austrian pair Thomas Morgenstern and Gregor Schlierenzauer who between them won 16 of the 27 individual competitions.

Thomas Morgenstern won the overall World Cup title – the first overall victory of his career – ahead of Gregor Schlierenzauer, with Finnish veteran Janne Ahonen finishing in third place. Ahonen won the traditional Four Hills Tournament, while Schlierenzauer won the Nordic Tournament.

The previous year's overall winner Adam Małysz had a disappointing season, finishing 12th overall, and failing to get a podium finish in any of the 27 competitions. The season also gave Tom Hilde and Anders Bardal of Norway the first World Cup victories of their respective careers.

Lower competitive circuits this season included the Continental Cup and Grand Prix.

Calendar

Men

Men's team

Individual World Cup 

The jumper highlighted in red was the leader of the World Cup  at the time of the competition and wore the red jersey.
The jumper highlighted in azure was the leader of the Nordic Tournament  at the time of the competition and wore the blue jersey.
The jumper highlighted in gold was the leader of the Four Hills Tournament at the time of the competition and wore the gold jersey.

Kuusamo 

 HS142 Rukatunturi, Finland
1 December 2007

Notes:

 Adam Małysz wore the red jersey as the reigning champion.
 Thomas Morgenstern set a new hill record in his first jump, with a 146.5 meter jump. A few minutes later, Gregor Schlierenzauer jumped 0.5 meters longer than Morgenstern, thus setting a new hill record.
 Tom Hilde reached the podium for the first time in his career. Bjørn Einar Romøren took his first podium since March 2006.

Trondheim 

 HS131 Granåsen, Norway
8 December 2007

Notes:

 Last season's runner-up in the World Cup and winner of the Four Hills Tournament Anders Jacobsen fell in his first test jump, and was sidelined with a concussion.

 HS131 Granåsen, Norway
9 December 2007

Villach 

 HS98 Alpenarena, Austria
13 December 2007

This competition replaces the cancelled competition at Kranj (see below).

 HS98 Alpenarena, Austria
14 December 2007

Kranj 

 HS109 Bauhenk, Slovenia
16 December 2007

Competition cancelled due to lack of snow and warm temperatures; replaced with an additional competition at Villach on 13 December 2007 (see above)

Engelberg 

 HS137 Gross-Titlis-Schanze, Switzerland
22 December 2007

 HS137 Gross-Titlis-Schanze, Switzerland
23 December 2007

Four Hills Tournament

Oberstdorf 

 HS137 Schattenbergschanze, Germany
30 December 2007

Garmisch-Partenkirchen 

 HS140 Große Olympiaschanze, Germany
1 January 2008

Notes:
 Janne Ahonen's 100th career podium finish.
 Michael Neumayer's first career podium finish.

Innsbruck 

 HS130 Bergiselschanze, Austria
4 January 2008

Competition cancelled due to strong winds; replaced with an additional competition at Bischofshofen on 5 January 2008 (see below)

Bischofshofen (5 January) 

 HS140 Paul-Ausserleitner-Schanze, Austria

5 January 2008

Bischofshofen (6 January) 

 HS140 Paul-Ausserleitner-Schanze, Austria

6 January 2008

Val di Fiemme 

 HS134 Trampolino dal Ben, Italy
12 January 2008

Notes:

 Tom Hilde's first career World Cup victory.
 Second round cancelled after Bjørn Einar Romøren lost his ski on the jump and suffered a nasty fall at the start of the second round.

 HS134 Trampolino dal Ben, Italy
13 January 2008

Harrachov 

 HS205 Čerťák, Czech Republic
19 January 20 January 2008

Competition rescheduled due to poor weather conditions. Second round cancelled due to strong winds.

 HS205 Čerťák, Czech Republic
20 January 2008

Competition cancelled due to strong winds

Zakopane 

 HS134 Wielka Krokiew, Poland
25 January 2008

 HS134 Wielka Krokiew, Poland
26 January 27 January 2008

Competition rescheduled because of strong winds. Second round cancelled because of strong winds and heavy snow.

Notes:
 Anders Bardal's first career World Cup victory.

Sapporo 

 HS134 Mt. Okura Ski Jump Stadium, Japan
2 February 2008

Notes:
 Thomas Morgenstern's 10th career World Cup victory.

 HS134 Mt. Okura Ski Jump Stadium, Japan
3 February 2008

Liberec 

 HS134 Ještěd, Czech Republic
8 February 2008

 HS134 Ještěd, Czech Republic
9 February 2008

Willingen 

 HS145 Mühlenkopfschanze, Germany
17 February 2008

Notes:
 With six races remaining, Thomas Morgenstern secured the 2007–08 Ski Jumping World Cup.

Nordic Tournament

Lahti 

 HS130 Salpausselkä skiing stadium, Finland
2 March 2008

Competition cancelled due to strong winds; replaced with an additional competition at Kuopio on 3 March 2008 (see below)

Kuopio 

 HS127 Puijo, Finland
3 March 2008

 HS127 Puijo, Finland
4 March 2008

Lillehammer 

 HS138 Lysgårdsbakken, Norway
7 March 2008

Oslo 

 HS128 Holmenkollen, Norway
9 March 2008

Notes:
Gregor Schlierenzauer won the Nordic Tournament, ahead of Tom Hilde and Janne Happonen

Planica 

 HS215 Letalnica, Slovenia
14 March 2008

Notes:
Gregor Schlierenzauer's 10th career World Cup victory. His first-round jump of 232.5 meters is also a new Austrian national record and the 5th longest ski jump of all time.

 HS215 Letalnica, Slovenia
16 March 2008

Overall Top 20 

Key

 1: Kuusamo (1 December 2007)
 2: Trondheim (8 December 2007)
 3: Trondheim (9 December 2007)
 4: Villach (13 December 2007)
 5: Villach (14 December 2007)
 6: Engelberg (22 December 2007)
 7: Engelberg (23 December 2007)
 8: Oberstdorf (30 December 2007)
 9: Garmisch-Partenkirchen (1 January 2008)
 10: Bischofshofen (5 January 2008)
 11: Bischofshofen (6 January 2008)
 12: Val di Fiemme (12 January 2008)
 13: Val di Fiemme (13 January 2008)
 14: Harrachov (20 January 2008)
 15: Zakopane (25 January 2008)
 16: Zakopane (27 January 2008)
 17: Sapporo (2 February 2008)
 18: Sapporo (3 January 2008)
 19: Liberec (8 February 2008)
 20: Liberec (9 February 2008)
 21: Willingen (17 February 2008)
 22: Kuopio (3 March 2008)
 23: Kuopio (4 March 2008)
 24: Lillehammer (7 March 2008)
 25: Oslo (9 March 2008)
 26: Planica (14 March 2008)
 27: Planica (16 March 2008)

Team World Cup

Kuusamo 

 HS142 Rukatunturi, Finland
30 November 2007

Notes:

 Thomas Morgenstern fell in his final jump, the longest of the competition.

Willingen 

 HS145 Mühlenkopfschanze, Germany
16 February 2008

Lahti 

 HS130 Salpausselkä, Finland
1 March 2008

Competition cancelled due to strong winds.

Planica 

 HS215 Letalnica, Slovenia
15 March 2008

Notes:
 Gregor Schlierenzauer improved his Austrian national record, set the day before, to 233.5 meters. This jump also tied Schlierenzauer with Janne Ahonen for the 4th longest ski jump in history.
 Anders Bardal's jump of 232.5 meters tied Schlierenzauer for the 6th longest ski jump in history.
 Martin Koch's jump of 105.5 metres from the first round, plunged the Austrian team onto the 3rd position, ruining the chance of winning the last team competition of the season, despite of his teammates' good results.

References
 World Cup standings, from fis-ski.com

World cup
World cup
FIS Ski Jumping World Cup